Çamardı is a quiet town and district of Niğde Province in the Central Anatolia region of Turkey, at the foot of Aladağ in the Taurus Mountains and reached by winding mountain roads. Population is 15,245 of which 3,396 live in the town of Çamardı. Çamardı is well known with its being very green in the summer. Many people come to Çamardı in order to spend their summer holidays in a green and quiet place. Çamardı is one of the gross producers of apple. You can find many kinds of apples in Çamardı. Also, in the last couple of years, cherry becomes one of the few mainstays of Çamardı. One of the well known families of Çamardı is the Köse Family.

Çamardı is a thickly wooded district in this relatively dry region and is known for its apples, and also attracts visitors to walk and climb the Aladağlar, which can be accessed from the villages of Demirkazık and Çukurbağ. The river Ecemiş runs through Çamardı.

References

Further reading 
 

Cappadocia
Çamardı towns and villages
Districts of Niğde Province